The Italian Catholic diocese of Nuoro is in Sardinia. It is a suffragan of the archdiocese of Cagliari. Historically it was the diocese of Galtellì until 1779, and then the diocese of Galtellì-Nuoro until 1928.

History
Galtellì was an episcopal see in 1138, when Pope Innocent II made it a suffragan of the archdiocese of Pisa; later, it was directly subject to the Holy See. In 1495, it was suppressed by Alexander VI, and its territory united to the diocese of Cagliari. In 1787, at the request of King Victor Emmanuel III, it was re-established, but the bishop continued to live at Nuoro. Among its bishops was Fra Arnolfo de Bissalis (1366).

Bishops

Diocese of Galtelli
Erected: 12th Century
Latin Name: Galtellinensis

Diocese of Galtelli-Nuoro (Galtelly Nori)
Name Changed: 21 July 1779
Latin Name: Galtellinensis-Nuorensis
Metropolitan: Archdiocese of Cagliari

Arnaldo Biscales, O. Carm. (11 Jul 1348 – ) 
...
Sebastien Abbatis, O.P. (6 Mar 1433 – 1451 Died) 
...
Giovanni Antioco Serra Urru (Sisra) (18 Sep 1780 – 8 Feb 1786 Died) 
Pietro Antonio Craveri, O.F.M. Obs. (7 Apr 1788 – 7 Oct 1801 Died) 
Alberto Maria Giuseppe Andrea Luigi Solinas (17 Jan 1803 – 17 Jul 1817 Died) 
Antonio-Maria Casabianca (29 Mar 1819 – 29 Jan 1828, when he was put under an interdict) 
Administrator: Giovanni Maria Bua, Archbishop of Oristano (died 1840)
Emanuele Marongiu Maccioni (11 Dec 1848 – 9 Oct 1852 Resigned) 
Salvatore Angelo de Martis, O. Carm. (22 Feb 1867 – 24 Jun 1902 Died) 
Luca Canepa (18 Feb 1903 – 11 Dec 1922 Died) 
Maurilio Fossati, O.Ss.G.C. (24 Mar 1924 – 2 Oct 1929 Appointed, Archbishop of Sassari)

Diocese of Nuoro
Name Changed: 27 January 1928
Latin Name: Nuorensis
Metropolitan: Archdiocese of Cagliari

Giuseppe Cogoni (20 Nov 1930 – 4 Nov 1938 Appointed, Archbishop of Oristano) 
Felice Beccaro (3 Mar 1939 – 26 Nov 1946 Appointed, Bishop of San Miniato) 
Giuseppe Melas (31 Jan 1947 – 10 Sep 1970 Died) 
Giovanni Melis Fois (7 Nov 1970 – 16 Apr 1992 Retired) 
Pietro Meloni (16 Apr 1992 – 21 Apr 2011 Retired) 
Mosè Marcia (21 Apr 2011 – 2 July 2019 Retired)
Antonio Mura (2 July 2019 – Present)

In 9 April 2020, Pope Francis appointed Bishop Mura as Bishop of Lanusei, in addition to his current role as Bishop of Nuoro.

References

Books

  (in Latin)

External links
Source

Nuoro
Diocese
Nuoro